Wamsley is an unincorporated community in Adams County, in the U.S. state of Ohio.

History
Wamsley was originally called Wamsleyville, and under the latter name was laid out in 1874 by William Wamsley, and named for him. A post office was established at Wamsley in 1869, and remained in operation until 1933.

References

Unincorporated communities in Adams County, Ohio
1874 establishments in Ohio
Populated places established in 1874
Unincorporated communities in Ohio